Lorenzo State Historic Site is a mansion built by Colonel John Lincklaen, founder of the village of Cazenovia, New York. Colonel Linklaen was the agent of the Holland Land Company upon whose recommendation the Company purchased the  tract of land where the village grew.  The painted brick mansion, begun in 1807 and completed in 1809, overlooks Cazenovia Lake.  It was listed in the National Register of Historic Places in July 1970.  Located on the grounds is the separately listed Rippleton Schoolhouse.

See also
 List of New York State Historic Sites

References

External links
Lorenzo State Historic Site at NYS Office of Parks, Recreation and Historic Preservation
Friends of Lorenzo
Lorenzo Collection at Syracuse University Special Collections Research Center

Houses on the National Register of Historic Places in New York (state)
Houses completed in 1809
New York (state) historic sites
Museums in Madison County, New York
Historic house museums in New York (state)
Houses in Madison County, New York
National Register of Historic Places in Cazenovia, New York